Kisan Mazdoor Bahujan Party (Peasants and Workers Majority Party) was a splinter group of the Jantantrik Bahujan Samaj Party in India. The leader of KMBP was Narendra Singh. In the state elections in Uttar Pradesh in 2002, KMBP was an ally of the Bharatiya Janata Party (BJP), and launched two BJP-supported candidates. KMBP was part of the state government in Uttar Pradesh around 2002. KMBP joined the Indian National Congress ahead of the Lok Sabha elections 2004.

Defunct political parties in Uttar Pradesh
Political schisms
Agrarian parties in India
Defunct socialist parties in India
1997 establishments in Uttar Pradesh
Political parties established in 1997
Political parties disestablished in 2004
2004 disestablishments in India